Naseer Ahamed Zainulabdeen, MP,  (Sinhala:නසීර් අහමඩ්), (born 16 April 1961)  is a Sri Lankan politician, Cabinet Minister and a member of the Sri Lankan parliament.  He is the former Chief Minister of Eastern Province, Sri Lanka. Chief Minister on 6 February 2015.
Following the mass resignation of the Sri Lankan cabinet in the wake of the 2022 Sri Lankan protests, he was appointed as the Minister of Environment by President Gotabaya Rajapaksa on 18 April 2022.

References 

Living people
Sri Lanka Muslim Congress politicians
Chief Ministers of Eastern Province, Sri Lanka
Members of the Eastern Provincial Council
Members of the 16th Parliament of Sri Lanka
1961 births